PS! is a magazine published in Sweden. It was the best selling magazine in the country in the year 2023.

References

Magazines published in Sweden
Swedish-language magazines
Magazines with year of establishment missing